The Knowlton Covered Bridge, near Rinard Mills, Ohio, was built around 1860.  It was listed on the National Register of Historic Places in 1980. It was decommissioned shortly after. Also known as the Long Covered Bridge, it is a Burr arch truss bridge.

It is located north of Rinard Mills, and is in Washington Township, Monroe County, Ohio.

The bridge has three spans over the Little Muskingum River. It was rehabilitated in 1995 and documented by the Historic American Engineering Record in 2004.

It is mentioned in the Ohio Historic Places Dictionary.

The middle span collapsed the evening of July 5, 2019. The Old Camp span has also collapsed, sometime in the summer of 2020.

See also
List of bridges documented by the Historic American Engineering Record in Ohio

References

External links

Covered bridges in Ohio
Historic American Engineering Record in Ohio
National Register of Historic Places in Monroe County, Ohio
Bridges completed in 1860